Armagh City, Banbridge and Craigavon is a local government district in Northern Ireland.  The district was created as Armagh, Banbridge and Craigavon on 1 April 2015 by merging the City and District of Armagh, Banbridge District and most of the Borough of Craigavon. The word "City" was added to the name on 24 February 2016, to reflect Armagh's city status. The local authority is Armagh City, Banbridge and Craigavon Borough Council.

Geography
The district covers parts of counties Armagh and Down, taking in the upper Bann valley and much of the southern shore of Lough Neagh as well as Armagh city. The name of the new district was announced on 17 September 2008.

Demographics

In the 2021 UK census, the district was 96.7% white.

The national identities of the new council from the 2011 census are:
50.5% British 
28.9% Northern Irish 
25.2% Irish
4.6% Other
1.3% English, Scottish, Welsh

The religious make up is as follows:
51.7% Protestant/Other Christian
43.0% Catholic
5.3% Other/None

Armagh City, Banbridge and Craigavon Borough Council

Armagh City, Banbridge and Craigavon Borough Council replaces Armagh City and District Council, Banbridge District Council and Craigavon Borough Council.

The first election for the new district council was originally due to take place in May 2009, but on April 25, 2008, Shaun Woodward, Secretary of State for Northern Ireland announced that the scheduled 2009 district council elections were to be postponed until 2011. The first elections took place on 22 May 2014 and the council acted as a shadow authority until 1 April 2015.

See also
 Local government in Northern Ireland

References

Districts of Northern Ireland, 2015-present